Corruption in South Africa includes the improper use of public resources for private ends, including bribery and improper favouritism. Corruption was at its highest during the period of state capture under presidency of Jacob Zuma and has remained widespread, negatively "affecting criminal justice, service provision, economic opportunity, social cohesion and political integrity" of South Africa. 

South Africa has a robust anti-corruption framework, but laws are inadequately enforced and accountability in public sectors such as healthcare remain below par. In addition, internal sanctions have been employed to discourage whistle-blowers from reporting corrupt activities in both the public and private sectors – according to a 2021 Afrobarometer survey, 76.2% of South Africans believe that ordinary people risk retaliation and other negative consequences if they report incidents of corruption.

A scandal involving the Gupta family and former South African President Jacob Zuma pushed Zuma out of office as a long list of corruption complaints against the former President resurfaced. Complaints against Zuma range from the former leader's lavish spending of state funds, to delegating contracts based on nepotism and businesses with familial connections or close ties benefiting through their association with him. The Zondo Commission was later created to investigate Zuma and his associates for corruption. On November 11, 2020, it was revealed that a historic anti-corruption blitz resulted in the arrest of more than 100 South African political, education, health, police and business officials on corruption charges.

Corruption has also negatively impacted South Africa's ability to resolve the country's long running energy crisis.

Perception of corruption in South Africa

In 2013, Afrobarometer found a substantial increase in the public's perception of corruption since 2008. 66% of South Africans believed that the government could be doing more to curb corruption, compared to 56% elsewhere on the continent.  South Africans' experience of first-hand corruption ranks among the least on a first-hand basis in Africa. At one stage only 15% of South Africans admit to having paid a bribe. The average percentage of all Africans having paid a bribe to government officials was around 30%.

Between 2011 and 2015, former President Jacob Zuma's public approval ratings almost halved, from 64% to 36%, possibly due to corruption scandals over that period. The majority of South Africans believe that various branches of government should oversee other branches of government's work. Around a quarter of South Africans feel they should be allowed to be responsible for holding elected representatives and leaders accountable.

Transparency International's 2022 Corruption Perceptions Index scored South Africa at 43 on a scale from 0 ("highly corrupt") to 100 ("very clean"). When ranked by score, South Africa ranked 72nd among the 180 countries in the Index, where the country ranked first is perceived to have the most honest public sector.  For comparison, South Africa's score was also the average score in 2022; the best score was 90 (ranked 1), and the worst score was 12 (ranked 180). When Transparency International began using its current scoring system in 2012, South Africa also received a score of 43; its score has varied between 42 and 45 since then.

In 2021, 9.1% of South Africans believed that corruption was the most important problem facing the country, meaning that corruption ranked second only to unemployment in the priorities of those surveyed. 60.5% believed that the government was doing "very badly" at fighting corruption, and another 15.4% believed that it was doing "fairly badly."

Apartheid and corruption

Apartheid, a system of discrimination and segregation on racial grounds, dominated the ideology and political system in South Africa from 1948 to 1994. This system, which intentionally excluded non-Afrikaners from civil service jobs, government positions, and politics entirely, came to an end in 1994 when the African National Congress headed by Nelson Mandela conducted negotiations with the South African government at the time.

Before the abolition of Apartheid, civil service was a pervasive medium for rent-seeking and the preferential treatment of Afrikaners. Policies favouring Afrikaner cultural and educational systems, the awarding of government contracts to Afrikaner businesses and the funding of parastatal Afrikaner organisations was a common phenomenon during the era of Apartheid. The building of rural homeland states in the 1980s created ideal projects for rent-seeking with many homeland leaders presiding over massive networks of patronage. A notable corruption scandal during apartheid was the Muldergate scandal that involved the improper use of public funds to conduct a pro-apartheid propaganda campaign; the scandal brought down the government of Prime Minister John Vorster.

During the anti-apartheid struggle the African National Congress (ANC) was receiving funds from foreign donors in order to build up stronger opposition parties to protest against South Africa's National Party and Apartheid. These leaders were given large sums of money without formal book-keeping. There is however no reports or evidence of corruption. The ANC's tradition of loyalty to the organization was shaped in the Apartheid era, with clear implications in modern-day ANC politics. In the middle years of Jacob Zuma's presidency, corruption became rampant in most government departments, intelligence agencies, the police and the military.

There is much ongoing debate regarding the origins of corruption and the definition of corruption in South Africa. The inherited bureaucracy and political culture which originated in the Apartheid era has rendered corruption issues hard to trace and tackle. The presidency of Jacob Zuma following 2009 created an environment where corruption has flourished under the new leadership. Both the new and old political order created their own types of corruption, benefiting those in their inner circles.  Although forms of endemic corruption were passed on to the new order since 1994, new forms of corruption have emerged adding new layers of theft from the State's purse.

Types of corruption in South Africa
Although South Africa is subjected to various types of corruption, three notable forms are wasteful expenditure, state capture, and corruption related to or using Black Economic Empowerment (BEE) legislation. Recent state capture scandals involving South African politicians and the Gupta family have brought these types of corruption into the public spotlight. Petty Corruption is another relevant issue affecting public services and day-to-day life in South Africa. Local municipalities have also been noted as significantly impacted by corruption with Corruption Watch describing them as amongst the most corrupt institutions in the country. A 2022 report by the Global Initiative Against Transnational Organized Crime has described the presence of organised crime as "an existential threat to South Africa’s democratic institutions, economy and people."

State capture 

State capture, type of systemic political corruption in which private interests significantly influence a state's decision-making processes to their own advantage, became prevalent in South Africa during the presidency of Jacob Zuma (see section below). The most notable incident of state capture corruption is the Gupta family scandal (see section below). State capture in South Africa has been estimated by government to have cost the country up to R 250 billion (US$ 17 billion) between 2014 and 2017, and reduce the country's GDP growth rate by an estimated 4% a year. Former South African Treasury official Ismail Momoniat has stated that state capture during the Zuma administration had caused such severe damage to the South African economy that it had effectively undid all the efforts of the Mandela and Mbeki administrations to develop the country's economy.

Black Economic Empowerment 

Two notable types of corruption related to the government policies of BEE and Broad-Based Black Economic Empowerment (BBBEE) are BEE fronting and political corruption.

Political corruption 
BEE and BBBEE requirements have been used to facilitate stated capture in South Africa with government contracts improperly awarded, at inflated prices, to politically connected "tenderpreneurs," sometimes to the detriment of quality and service delivery.  A notable criticism of BBBEE is that the policy has been co-opted and repurposed by factions and powerful members of South Africa's political elite, mostly within the governing African National Congress (ANC), for the purposes of corrupt self-enrichment at the expense of South Africans who are not politically connected. Thereby fueling the growth of corruption within South Africa, reducing economic growth and increasing unemployment. Moeletsi Mbeki has argued that BEE is the biggest driver of corruption in South Africa.

BEE fronting 
BEE fronting is an abuse of the rules governing BEE, where qualifying persons are given a seat on the Board of a company while having no decision-making power in the company, in order to qualify the company for government contracts in terms of BEE.
In June 2017, Netcare, a company which operates the largest private hospital network in South Africa, was accused of BEE fronting. Since then, 17 other complaints have been filed against various South African companies regarding BEE fronting. Related to this is Cadre deployment and employment, which is an official ANC policy to colonize government with officials loyal to the ANC.

Petty corruption
Petty corruption is a prevalent issue in South Africa's public service sphere. A survey conducted by the ISS National Victims of Crime tested the extent and nature of petty corruption in South Africa. One of the main issues highlighted by this survey is South Africans' lack of access to information regarding how to report corrupt acts.  The fear of facing repercussions for whistle blowing and the pervasive belief that reporting corruption will not cause change are two other concerns revealed by the 2011 survey. Respondents of the survey were most likely to pay bribes to traffic officials, followed by police officers and officials in employment offices.  These findings support the notion that the perception of corruption in local government departments such as traffic and municipal policing is high.  The frequency of bribes involving police officers is concerning due to their role in tackling corruption and illicit behavior. Only 5.6% of South Africans reported experiencing forms of petty corruption involving either money, favours and gifts. Even though the percentage of experienced corruption is low, the high perception of corruption has led respondents to prioritize corruption as the second most prevalent crime in the country.

Corruption scandals

Jacob Zuma and corruption

Zuma's time in office has been marked by controversy and accusations of corruption.  Zuma's resignation on February 14, 2018 came after months of pressure from the ANC. In April 2018 it was announced that Zuma would be prosecuted on 12 counts of fraud, one of racketeering, two of corruption and one of money laundering. Zuma faced corruption charges involving the US$2.5 billion South African Arms Deal. On 11 October 2019, a South African high court denied Zuma a motion to withdraw the recent criminal charges against him. Zuma was imprisoned for refusing to give evidence to the Zondo Commission resulting in the July 2021 unrest.

Nkandla 

The Nkandla homestead scandal involved the controversial, and possibly corrupt, funding of President Jacob Zuma's personal homestead at public expense. After a home invasion and the subsequent rape of one of Zuma's four wives, Zuma accessed the means to upgrade security measures of his homestead.  A report by South Africa's public protector in 2014 found Zuma had inappropriately allocated state funds to finance additional home improvements such as the addition of a swimming pool, amphitheater, visitor centre and cattle enclosure to his property (among others). In 2018, South Africa's highest court found Mr. Zuma guilty of violating the constitution in regard to the lavish spending of R 246 million  (US$19.14 million) of State funds towards Zuma's homestead in Nkandla.

Gupta family scandal 

Zuma's close relationship with the Gupta family has been highlighted in the former South African Public Protector's report on State Capture.

In 2016, the Public Protector, Thuli Madonsela, investigated the Gupta Family Scandal after receiving a formal complaint from a Catholic priest, called Father Stanslaus Muyebe.  The State of Capture report released by the Public Protector in 2016 reports on the dangers of state capture in the case of South Africa. The 355-page document reports Mr. Zuma's preferential treatment of the Gupta family and the involvement of Jacob Zuma's son and the Gupta family.  The allegations reported include the Gupta Family's involvement in the appointments and removals of members of the South African cabinet, the unlawful awarding of state contracts to Gupta linked companies or persons, the banks’ preferential treatment of Gupta owned companies and Zuma's conflict of interest concerning his position and business dealings.  The Gupta brothers, who have been major players in South African business for over a decade began growing their relationship with former President Jacob Zuma in 2003 as he occupied the Office of Deputy President. Since 2003, both parties benefited from an understanding wherein the Gupta family financed the Zuma family while President Zuma appointed friendly officials and awarded lucrative state contracts to the Gupta empire.  South African authorities are seeking to recover up to US$4.07 billion lost to these Gupta deals. Jacob Zuma's son, Duduzane and Gloria Ngeme Zuma, one of Mr. Zuma's wives, received large transfers and monthly salaries for positions held at one of the Gupta firms.

The Gupta family has engaged in a numerous suspicious transactions involving a series of shell companies and state-owned enterprises.  The OCCRP has reported on Transnet's contract with South China Rail and subcontracts with Gupta run organizations. State controlled companies like Eskom and Transnet are in the centre of illicit deals with Gupta companies. An arrest warrant for Ajay Gupta was issued in February 2018. Some of the members of the Gupta family – the prime accused in the corruption case – were reported of residing in the emirate of Dubai as of 11 June 2021. The Bank of Baroda played an important role in facilitating irregular financial transactions for the Guptas.

Russian nuclear deal 

In 2014 the Zuma administration and the Russian government put pressure on the South African government to sign a R1 trillion (US$66 billion) nuclear energy deal with the Russian state owned enterprise Rosatom to build and operate up to eight nuclear power plants in an effort to resolve the South African energy crisis; both the Russian government and the Zuma administration were criticized for forcing through the deal by attempting to circumvent South Africa's procurement laws. Then South African Finance Minister Nhlanhla Nene gave testimony to the Zondo Commission that he was fired for not approving a US$100 billion version of the deal in 2015. The deal was cancelled by court order in April 2017.

Eskom 

The state owned national power utility Eskom as experienced numerous corruption scandals since the start of the South African energy crisis in 2008 and increased in intensity from 2019 onward. These range from outright theft of diesel for backup generators, providing substandard coal for coal fired power plants, and metal theft to sabotaging energy infrastructure so as to get contracts to do repairs. Corruption, particularity state capture, has also negatively impacted the construction and operation of new power plants, notably Medupi and Kusile. Then Eskom CEO, André de Ruyter, controversially stated in a public interview that four criminal syndicates had established themselves within Eskom, that corruption was costing the utility a billion Rand a month (roughly equivalent to US$ 53.9 million), and that a senior ANC MP was involved. De Ruyter went on to say that "load shedding is, to a large extent, attributable to crime and corruption" within Eskom.

The Arms Deal scandal

The arms deal, formally known as the Strategic Defence Package, was a multi-billion dollar deal involving arms acquisitions from countries such as Germany and France. This arms deal set a precedent for cases of large-scale corruption and high levels of bribery and embezzlement in the African National Congress. This arms deal came at a time when the AIDS epidemic was rampant throughout Africa and poverty and inequality in the region still remained among the highest in the world. Taxpayers protested the arms deal through a public interest lawsuit claiming that the deal was unconstitutional and irrational. Various South African and international evidence teams have been investigating the arms deal since the early 2000s.  Rumors of embezzlement, bribes and kick-backs by and between the external players in this procurement and that of the ANC, have prompted further investigations. In 2011, Former President Zuma appointed a Commission of Enquiry headed by Judge Seriti. to investigate allegations of impropriety, fraud and corruption around the 1998 Arms Deal.

As of March 2018, Jacob Zuma has been facing 16 charges of corruption, money laundering, racketeering and fraud involving the 1998 Arms Deal. In total Zuma has been accused of accepting 783 illegal payments, including receiving bribes from a French Arms firm via his financial advisor. In April 2018, two months after resigning from office, Zuma was charged with graft by a national jury. On 11 October 2019, a South African high court upheld all 16 charges against Zuma. A 15-month prison sentence which was issued to Zuma for contempt of court on this case would be reserved by the Constitutional Court of South Africa on 12 July 2021. On 20 July 2021, it was agreed that former South African President Jacob Zuma's criminal trial for this would case would begin on either August 10 or August 13, 2021. Prior to his imprisonment Zuma threatened that his arrest would result in nationwide riots; following his imprisonment in July 2021 triggered large scale riots and looting in KwaZulu-Natal and Gauteng provinces.

Other notable corruption scandals

1990s

 The Reverent Allan Boesak was found to have misappropriated donor funds in 1994 intended for his Foundation for Peace and Justice causing significant public controversy. Boesak was found guilty of stealing R332,000 in 1999 and convicted.
 In 1995 senior ANC member Winnie Mandela was accused of receiving a US$20,000 bribe from a building contracting company so they could secure government tenders to build public housing. 
 Sarafina 2 was a government funded play based on the musical Sarafina! that was to increase awareness of the South African HIV/AIDS epidemic. In 1996 the ANC and South African government were criticized for not taking action against Health Minister Nkosazana Zuma and other ANC members accused of corruption and misconduct in organising the US$4 million play.
 ANC member and deputy minister of Environment and Tourism, Bantu Holomisa, was expelled from the ANC in 1996 after Holomisa accused former Transkei Prime Minister Stella Sigcau and a number of ANC members of being involved in a corrupt relationship with the South African casino magnate Sol Kerzner.
 Former President Jacob Zuma's financial advisor, Schabir Shaik, was sentenced to 15 years in 2005 for soliciting a bribe from a French arms company Thales in 1999. The bribe was solicited on behalf of Zuma when he was Deputy President of South Africa. Then presidential spokesperson Mac Maharaj was implicated in the bribery scandal when investigated by the Scorpions in 2003.

2000s
 New National Party politician Abe Williams was convicted in the year 2000 of corruption involving R240,112 and theft of R383,000 of donor funds intended for the upliftment of impoverished West Coast communities.
 The 2004 Oilgate scandal involved the transfer of R11 million from the state owned PetroSA to the ANC so as to help fund its re-election campaign in the run-up to the 2004 national elections. The Mail & Guardian newspaper was controversially gagged by the courts from publishing a report on the scandal following the election.
 Tony Yengeni, the ANC's chief parliamentary whip, was found guilty of fraud in 2005 after Yengeni received a large discount on a luxury car from a firm bidding for a government contract. In 2007 Goodwood police station commander, Siphiwu Hewana, was found guilty of attempting to defeat the ends of justice by tampering with the docket for convicted fraudster Tony Yengeni's arrest for driving under the influence.
 In 2005, the Travelgate scandal exposed Members of Parliament who were found to have illegally used parliamentary travel vouchers in a fraud exceeding R37,000,000 for personal use. As the CFO who identified the fraud reported: "I, Harry Charlton FCA, JP can confirm 6 travel agents and 435 then past and present MP's including 3 members of Mbeki's Cabinet were implicated - most of them ANC MPs. 50 plea bargained for sentences that would allow them to remain as MPs. There were 3 formats of fraud totalling in excess of R37 million (USD12million). The investigation went back 15 months but there was clear evidence that the fraud had been operating for a longer period. As I would not cooperate my services were terminated by Secretary Dingani in January 2016".  Dingani was himself was terminated for fraud.
Former South African President Thabo Mbeki and Sepp Blatter agreed to a $10m deal in 2007, which US prosecutors say was a "bribe" to secure the 2010 World Cup.

2010s
Former National Police Commissioner and ex-President of Interpol, Jackie Selebi, was charged with graft in July 2010, for receiving (at least) R120,000 from alleged crime-syndicate boss, Glenn Agliotti.
The Vrede Dairy Project was a 2012 government project established to empower black dairy farmers in the town of Vrede at a cost of R250 million. The Gupta family and Free State provincial premier Ace Magashule were implicated in the theft of almost all the project's funds.  
National secretary general of the ANC, Ace Magashule, was suspended from his position  and arrested on 21 charges of corruption for his involvement in a 2014 corruption scandal that took place whilst he was Premier of the Free State. The R255 million contact to remove asbestos from public housing in the province was awarded to Blackhead Consulting that in turn made numerous payments to third parties at Magashule's instruction or with his knoweldge.
In 2015 the German offices of the South African based private company Steinhoff International were raided. This publicly exposed one of the biggest cases of "corporate fraud in South Africa's history" implicating Steinhoff's South African CEO Markus Jooste.
The collapse of the VBS Mutual Bank in 2018 due to fraud and corruption created a scandal that implicated municipalities, the ANC, and the Economic Freedom Fighters.

2020s
The emergence of a “rogue unit” within the Western Cape Crime Intelligence Division of the South African Police Service (SAPS) resulting in the murder of investigating officer Charl Kinnear in 2020.
Corruption within the Gauteng Provincial Government Department of Health resulting in the 2021 murder of Babita Deokaran.
Digital Vibes scandal involving Minister of Health Zweli Mkhize awarding a large COVID-19 communications tender to family members.

Anti-corruption initiatives

Government initiatives against corruption are coordinated by the Department of Public Service and Administration. The Public Protector also plays a role in fighting corruption. A disbanded independent anti-corruption unit named the Scorpions was replaced by the Hawks.  South Africa's Directorate for Priority Crime Investigation (DPCI), commonly known as the Hawks, was designed to target organized crime, economic crime and corruption. The group was established by the Zuma administration in 2008.   South Africa has a well-developed framework and legislation outlining corruption initiatives. The Prevention and Combating of Corruption Act (PCCA) criminalizes corruption in public and private sectors and codifies specific offences making it easier for courts to use the legislation. This act especially condemns bribery, extortion, abuse of power and money laundering while obliging public officials to report corruption offences. Like many corruption regulations in South Africa, the PCCA is poorly implemented and the Act does not include any protection measures for whistle-blowers.

The National Anti-Corruption Forum provides an online guide to the Prevention and Combating of Corruption Act (PCCA). Other acts like the Promotion of Access to Information Act calls for an increased access to public information.  The Public Finance Management Act examines government expenditures and the Code of Conduct for Assembly and Permanent Council members calls for the full disclosure of members to report gifts. Enforcement mechanisms remain weak for many of these preventative Acts, allow for corrupt actions to go unreported. South Africa has ratified the United Nations Convention against Corruption, the African Union Convention on Preventing and Combating Corruption and the OECD Anti-Bribery Convention.

In 2018 the Zondo Commission of Inquiry was set up to investigate allegations of State Capture and corruption during the administration of President Jacob Zuma.  Testimony given during the inquiry implicated Bosasa, Bain & Company, the Gupta family and associates of former President Zuma.  During the inquiry hearings a joint memorandum signed by the embassies of the United States, the United Kingdom, the Netherlands, Germany and Switzerland representing countries that make up 75% of foreign direct investment into South Africa warned that if unaddressed corruption would have a negative impact on future investment in South Africa.  It called for President Ramaphosa at act against perpetrators of corruption.  The South African government responded that it was disappointed by the memorandum not following "acceptable" diplomatic practices.

2020 anti-corruption blitz 
On September 30, 2020, ousted Mangaung mayor Olly Mlamleli was arrested over a controversial asbestos contract which was issued during her time as a Member of the Free State Executive Council (MEC) for Cooperative Governance. Other co-defendats of Mlamleli would be arrested as well. All seven people charged in the asbestos corruption case were granted bail.

On 30 July 2020, Lieutenant-General Khomotso Phahlane, who was also former acting SAPS Commissioner,  was dismissed from the SAPS, following 3 years on suspension, after he was found guilty of dishonest conduct. On 12 October 2020, Lieutenant-General Bonang Mgwenya, the country's second-most senior police official, was arrested on charges of corruption, fraud, theft and money laundering involving about R200-million and afterwards appeared in Ridge Magistrates’ court. At the time of Mgwenya's arrest, she and Phahlane were among 14 fellow South African officers who were charged with corruption. Mgwenya was suspended on 15 October 2020 and was dismissed from SAPS on 13 November 2020. On 23 December 2020, four Cape Town police officers attached to the national border control unit at Cape Town International Airport were arrested for extorting money from Chinese businesses.

On November 11, 2020, Business Insider reported that more than 100 people were arrested in recent weeks in an anti-corruption blitz. Those arrested included VBS Mutual Bank executives, federal Unemployment Insurance Fund (UIF) officials, numerous government officials in Gauteng and Limpopo, the mayor and municipal director of JB Marks, former Bosasa COO and Zuma whistleblower Angelo Agrizzi, ANC MP and former state security minister Bongani Bongo and numerous other government officials from hailing from Mpumalanga, ANC chair Ace Magashule, Christian minister Shepherd Bushiri, and former ANC MP Vincent Smith. In December 2020, Deputy Chief Justice of South Africa Raymond Zondo ordered Zuma to resume testifying before his Zondo Commission. Zondo also served two summonses which arranged for Zuma's required 2021 testimony to occur from January 18–22 and February 15–19.

On 4 June 2020, six senior Gauteng police officers where among 14 people arrested on corruption charges. Two other senior officers, now retired, were arrested as well. Among the Gauteng-based SAPS officers charged with corruption included three brigadiers and a retired SAPS Lieutenant General. On December 17, 2020, former KwaZulu-Natal police commissioner Mmamonnye Ngobeni and her co-defendant, Durban businessman Thoshan Panday, returned to court on corruption charges.

Impact 
Despite going anti-corruption efforts the South African Auditor-General reported that for the 2020/21 financial year "government spending that has ‘not been either recovered, condoned or written off stood at R488.14-billion’ " (roughly equivalent to US$34.28 billion) with a significant proportion of that amount being spent on COVID-19 related projects widely reported as being corrupt by the media.  The Special Investigating Unit found that 66% of funding for COVID-19 PPE procurement was consumed by corruption or fraud.

See also 
 International Anti-Corruption Academy
 Group of States Against Corruption
 International Anti-Corruption Day
 ISO 37001 Anti-bribery management systems
 United Nations Convention against Corruption
 OECD Anti-Bribery Convention
 Judicial Commission of Inquiry into Allegations of State Capture, Corruption and Fraud in the Public Sector including Organs of State

References

Further reading 

 How to Steal a Country (2019), Documentary

Reports 
 South Africa Corruption Report
 Bribery tops list of corrupt activities in SA
 Lessons for South Africa's SOEs from other African countries
 ‘No Room To Hide: A President Caught in the Act’ Report by Organisation Undoing Tax Abuse
 State Capture Portfolio Organisation Undoing Tax Abuse State Capture Portfolio

Books 

 Mkhabela, Mpumelelo (2022). The Enemy Within. Tafelberg. 
 Williams, Athol (2021). Deep Collusion: Bain and the capture of South Africa. Tafelberg. 
 Blackman, Matthew & Dall, Nick (2021). Rogues’ Gallery: An Irreverent History of Corruption in South Africa, from the VOC to the ANC. Penguin Random House (SA), 
 Myburgh, Pieter-Louis  (2019). Gangster State, The Penguin Group (SA), 
 Pauw, Jacques (2017). The President's Keepers. NB Publishers. 
 Basson, Adriaan &  du Toit, Pieter (2017). Enemy of the People, Jonathan Ball Publishers, 
 Myburgh, Pieter-Louis  (2017). The Republic of Gupta, Penguin Books, 
 Olver, Crispian (2017). How to Steal a City, Jonathan Ball Publishers, 
 Feinstein, Andrew (2007). After the Party, Jonathan Ball Publishers, 

 
South Africa
Controversies in South Africa